Seligeriaceae is a family of mosses in the subclass Dicranidae.

References

Moss families
Grimmiales